Peştəsər (also, Peştəsar and Peshtasar) is a village and municipality in the Yardymli Rayon of Azerbaijan.  It has a population of 459.  The municipality consists of the villages of Peştəsər and Fındıqlıqışlaq.

References 

Populated places in Yardimli District